Maria Belibasaki (born 19 June 1991) is a retired Greek sprinter. At the 2012 Summer Olympics, she competed in the 200 metres and the 100 metres and in the 200 m at the 2016 Summer Olympics. She won the silver medal at the 2018 European Championships in the 400 metres race.

Results

1Disqualified in the semifinals

References

1991 births
Living people
Greek female sprinters
Olympic athletes of Greece
Athletes (track and field) at the 2012 Summer Olympics
Athletes (track and field) at the 2016 Summer Olympics
World Athletics Championships athletes for Greece
People from Sitia
Olympic female sprinters
Sportspeople from Crete